Zurk's Learning Safari is an educational adventure game by American studio Soleil Software. It was followed by Zurk's Rainforest Lab and Zurk's Alaskan Trek. They were part of a larger Soleil's Whole World Learning Series.

Production
In 1992, Barbara Christiani left Addison Wesley and founded educational software company Soleil Software with Ragni Pasturel. The studio's  work included the Zurk series, and WorldWalker: Destination Australia. The game contains voice over work in English, French, and Spanish. The game includes activities applicable to life sciences, reading and early math skills.

Reception

Critical reception
PC Mag thought the game was "visually breathtaking", praising its storybook atmosphere. The Washington Post deemed it a "top-notch product". The New York Times felt it was a " a very nice program" from an adult's perspective. EdWeek praised Alaskan Trek for stimulating critical thinking. The Palm Beach Post felt the games best features allowed young players to create their own nature animations on the screen and assemble electronic notebooks.

Awards and nominations
 1997 Only the Best honor from the Association for Supervision and Curriculum Development for Zurk's Alaskan Trek.

References

External links

1993 video games
Adventure games
DOS games
Children's educational video games
Classic Mac OS games
Video games developed in the United States
Video games set in forests
Windows games